The 2020–21 Atlantic 10 Conference men's basketball season is the 45th season of Atlantic 10 Conference basketball. The season began with practices in November 2020, followed by the start of the 2020–21 NCAA Division I men's basketball season in late November, delayed due to the COVID-19 pandemic. League play will begin in early January and end in early March.

The 2021 Atlantic 10 tournament was originally scheduled to be held from March 10–14, 2021, at Barclays Center in Brooklyn, New York, but due to ongoing impacts from the COVID-19 pandemic, the tournament was moved to campus locations. The tournament was first scheduled to be played on the same dates but split between the Robins Center at the University of Richmond and the Siegel Center at VCU, but the schedule was later adjusted so that the first four rounds will be played from March 3 to March 6 at those arenas with the championship game to be held March 14 at UD Arena at the University of Dayton.

Dayton were the defending regular season champion. Due to the COVID-19 pandemic, there was no defending Atlantic 10 Tournament champion.

Preseason

Preseason poll
Prior to the season at the conference's annual media day, awards and a poll were chosen by a panel of the league's head coaches and select media members.

Preseason all-conference teams

Regular season

Early season tournaments

Source:

Rankings

*USA TODAY did not release a Coaches Poll for Week 2. AP does not release a final poll.

Conference matrix
This table summarizes the head-to-head results between teams in conference play. Each team will play 18 conference games: one game vs. eight opponents and two games against five opponents.

Records against other conferences
2020–21 records against non-conference foes as of February 19, 2021. Records shown for regular season only.

Conference awards
On March 10, 2021, the Atlantic 10 announced its conference awards.

Postseason

2021 A-10 Tournament

2021 NCAA Tournament

Two teams from the Atlantic 10 qualified for the NCAA Tournament. Tournament and regular-season champion St. Bonaventure qualified through the conference's automatic bid, while tournament and regular-season runner-up VCU qualified through an at-large bid.

2021 NIT

Four teams from the Atlantic 10 earned at-large bids into the NIT.

References